Shumehri (also Romanized as Shūmehrī; also known as Shūmedrī) is a village in Sorkh Qaleh Rural District, in the Central District of Qaleh Ganj County, Kerman Province, Iran. At the 2006 census, its population was 585, in 104 families.

References 

Populated places in Qaleh Ganj County